Peripatopsis moseleyi is a species of velvet worm in the Peripatopsidae family. Males of this species (as traditionally defined) have 20 to 24 pairs of legs with claws (plus one pair without claws); females have 19 to 23 pairs of legs with claws (plus one pair without claws). Females range from 11 mm to 75 mm in length, whereas males range from 9 mm to 50 mm. The type locality is in South Africa.

More recent phylogenetic results indicate that this species as traditionally defined is instead a species complex (P. moseleyi sensu lato) containing five genetically distinct clades, now described as separate species: P. birgeri, P. hamerae, P. janni, P. stortchi, and P. moseleyi sensu stricto. Males of this species more narrowly defined (P. moseleyi sensu stricto) have 22 to 24 pregenital pairs of legs (plus one genital pair); females have 23 pregenital pairs (plus one genital pair). Female specimens range from 42 mm to 60 mm in length; males range from 22 mm to 40 mm in length.

References

Further reading

Endemic fauna of South Africa
Onychophorans of temperate Africa
Onychophoran species
Animals described in 1879
Invertebrates of South Africa